Good things come to those who wait may refer to:
Good things come to those who wait (Guinness), a UK advertising campaign for Guinness stout in the 1990s and 2000s
Good things come to those who wait (Heinz), a US advertising campaign for Heinz ketchup in the 1980s
"Good things come to those who wait", a 1984 song by Nayobe